Cecil Sebastian Afrika (born 3 March 1988) is a South African rugby sevens player for the South Africa national team, where he plays at flyhalf. He also plays for the San Diego Legion of Major League Rugby (MLR).

Afrika was a member of the South African Sevens team that won a bronze medal at the 2016 Summer Olympics.

Early life
Afrika attended Hentie Cilliers High School in Virginia. Afrika represented the South African Schoolboys in 2006. He was part of the South African under-20 squad in the 2008 IRB Junior World Championship that reached the third place playoffs.

National sevens team
Afrika debuted for the South African sevens team during the Dubai leg of the 2009–10 IRB Sevens World Series. During the Las Vegas leg of the 2009–10 IRB Sevens World Series he was carried off the field on a stretcher after he was injured during the Plate Final match against Fiji, South Africa won 12–7. He was part of the sevens team that took Bronze at the 2010 Commonwealth Games held in Delhi, India in October.

Afrika missed out on the 2011 Wellington Sevens because of a broken jaw he suffered during the South African leg of the IRB Sevens Series. He was the top try and point-scorer for the 2010–11 IRB Sevens World Series; He scored 40 tries throughout the series with a total of 385 points.
In 2011 he won the IRB International Sevens Player of the Year award.

In 2013, Afrika was included in the squad for the 2013 Rugby World Cup Sevens.

2016 Summer Olympics
Afrika was included in a 12-man squad for the 2016 Summer Olympics in Rio de Janeiro. He was named in the starting line-up for their first match in Pool B of the competition against Spain and scored two tries and two conversions to help South Africa to a 24–0 victory. He started their second match against France, converting three of South Africa's tries in a 26–0 victory, and dropped to the bench for their final match against Australia. Despite a 5–12 defeat in this match, South Africa still finished top of Pool B to set up a quarter final rematch against Australia. Afrika was restored to the starting line-up for this match and converted one of South Africa's tries in a 22–5 victory. He started South Africa's semi-final match against Great Britain but could not prevent them losing 5–7 to be eliminated from gold medal contention. He also started their third-place play-off, scoring two tries and kicking five conversions in his side's 54–14 victory over Japan to help South Africa secure a bronze medal in the competition.

Retirement
Afrika retired from international sevens as South Africa's all time leading World Series scorer in June 2020.

Club Rugby 
Afrika came through at the South African Currie Cup side Griffons before transitioning into the South African 7s setup. In 2017 he has a brief stint with the Cheetahs in their first season in the Pro14.

In 2021 Afrika signed for American side San Diego Legion for the 2021 season as a fullback.

References

External links
 
 
 
 
 

1988 births
Living people
Sportspeople from Port Elizabeth
South African rugby union players
Rugby sevens players at the 2010 Commonwealth Games
Rugby sevens players at the 2014 Commonwealth Games
Rugby sevens players at the 2018 Commonwealth Games
Commonwealth Games bronze medallists for South Africa
World Rugby Awards winners
South Africa international rugby sevens players
South Africa Under-20 international rugby union players
Commonwealth Games gold medallists for South Africa
Rugby sevens players at the 2016 Summer Olympics
Olympic rugby sevens players of South Africa
Olympic bronze medalists for South Africa
Olympic medalists in rugby sevens
Medalists at the 2016 Summer Olympics
Commonwealth Games medallists in rugby sevens
Griffons (rugby union) players
Commonwealth Games rugby sevens players of South Africa
Rugby union wings
Rugby union fullbacks
Free State Cheetahs players
Cheetahs (rugby union) players
San Diego Legion players
Medallists at the 2010 Commonwealth Games
Medallists at the 2014 Commonwealth Games